The "Imperial Anthem of Iran", also known by its incipit "Long Live our King of Kings", was the royal anthem of Iran from 1933 until the Islamic Revolution of 1979, when the monarchy was abolished.

Its tune, when set to a different respective set of lyrics, also served as Iran's national anthem and flag anthem at the time. This anthem was composed by the order of Reza Shah to the Iranian Literary Association.

Lyrics

Notes

References

External links 

 "Imperial Anthem of Iran" at National Anthems Info

Pahlavi Iran
Historical national anthems
Royal anthems
Iranian patriotic songs
Asian anthems
National anthem compositions in F major